Marcel Guitard (27 August 1929 – 7 December 1994) was a French professional racing cyclist. He rode in two editions of the Tour de France.

References

External links
 

1929 births
1994 deaths
French male cyclists
Place of birth missing